Chuck Crawford "Chuck" Hartwig (June 1, 1912 – September 15, 1950) was an American football player. At six feet and 190 pounds, he was a native of West Virginia.  He attended the University of Pittsburgh where he played at the guard position for the Pitt Panthers football team.  He was a consensus first-team selection on the 1934 College Football All-America Team. He was later an assistant coach for the Panthers.

References

1912 births
1950 deaths
American football guards
Pittsburgh Panthers football players
All-American college football players
Pittsburgh Panthers football coaches
Players of American football from West Virginia
People from Wetzel County, West Virginia